A shoulder is a group of three bones in the human body.

Shoulder may also refer to:

Arts, entertainment, and media
Shoulders (band), band whose several former members formed the band Constantines
 "Shoulders", a song by Coheed and Cambria from the 2022 album Vaxis – Act II: A Window of the Waking Mind
 "Shoulders", a song by the Australian–American band For King & Country from their 2014 album Run Wild. Live Free. Love Strong.

Other uses
Shoulder (road), an emergency stopping lane by the verge of a road or motorway
"Shoulders," nickname of Barry Latman, Major League Baseball pitcher
Shoulder, a term used in sensitometry

See also
Cold shoulder
Head and shoulders (disambiguation)
Topographic prominence, e.g., a shoulder crop